Lukáš Kašpar (born 23 September 1985) is a Czech professional ice hockey player. He is currently playing with HC Kometa Brno  of the Czech Extraliga (ELH). He was originally drafted by the San Jose Sharks in the first round (22nd overall) of the 2004 NHL Entry Draft.

Playing career
Kašpar was the 22nd overall pick of the Sharks in the 2004 NHL Entry Draft. He came to North America in 2004 to play for the Ottawa 67's of the Ontario Hockey League, tallying 21 goals and 30 assists, making it to the Memorial Cup in his first and only year in Canadian Junior Hockey.

After signing a three-year entry-level contract with the Sharks, Kašpar scored his first goal in the National Hockey League on 12 October 2008 against Jason LaBarbera of the Los Angeles Kings in a 1–0 victory. Kašpar's second National Hockey League goal was again against the Kings on 19 February 2009 against goaltender Erik Ersberg.

On 21 July 2009, he signed a two-year, two-way contract with the Philadelphia Flyers for an undisclosed amount. He was assigned to the AHL affiliate Adirondack Phantoms before he opted to terminate his contract after 8 games and return to Europe on 4 November 2009, having signed a season-long deal with Kärpät in the Finnish SM-liiga.

After two seasons with HC Donbass, and with the club suspending operations due to civil unrest, Kaspar opted to join HC Ugra on a one-year deal on 10 July 2014.

Career statistics

Regular season and playoffs

International

References

External links

 

1985 births
Living people
Adirondack Phantoms players
Barys Nur-Sultan players
Czech ice hockey left wingers
HC Donbass players
HC Dynamo Moscow players
HC Litvínov players
Oulun Kärpät players
National Hockey League first-round draft picks
Ottawa 67's players
Sportspeople from Most (city)
San Jose Sharks draft picks
San Jose Sharks players
HC Slovan Bratislava players
HC Yugra players
Worcester Sharks players
HC Kometa Brno players
BK Mladá Boleslav players
Czech expatriate ice hockey players in Canada
Czech expatriate ice hockey players in the United States
Czech expatriate ice hockey players in Finland
Czech expatriate ice hockey players in Russia
Czech expatriate ice hockey players in Slovakia
Czech expatriate sportspeople in Ukraine
Czech expatriate sportspeople in Kazakhstan
Czech expatriate sportspeople in France
Expatriate ice hockey players in France
Expatriate ice hockey players in Kazakhstan
Expatriate ice hockey players in Ukraine